Vladimir Konstantinovich Golyas (born 25 January 1971) is a Russian middle-distance runner. He competed in the 3000 metres steeplechase at the 1992 Summer Olympics and the 1996 Summer Olympics.

References

External links
 

1971 births
Living people
Athletes (track and field) at the 1992 Summer Olympics
Athletes (track and field) at the 1996 Summer Olympics
Russian male middle-distance runners
Russian male steeplechase runners
Olympic athletes of the Unified Team
Olympic athletes of Russia
Place of birth missing (living people)